HNLMS Isaac Sweers may refer to following ships of the Royal Netherlands Navy:

 , a  
 , a 

Royal Netherlands Navy ship names